Lombardy is an administrative region of Italy that covers ; it is located in the northern-central part of the country and has a population of about 10 million people, constituting more than one-sixth of Italy's population. Over a fifth of the Italian gross domestic product (GDP) is produced in the region.

The Lombardy region is located between the Alps mountain range and tributaries of the Po river, and includes Milan, the largest metropolitan area in the country, and among the largest in the European Union (EU). Of the fifty-eight UNESCO World Heritage Sites in Italy, eleven are in Lombardy. Virgil, Pliny the Elder, Ambrose, Gerolamo Cardano, Caravaggio, Claudio Monteverdi, Antonio Stradivari, Cesare Beccaria, Alessandro Volta and Alessandro Manzoni; and popes John XXIII and Paul VI originated in the area of modern-day Lombardy region.

Etymology
The name Lombardy comes from Lombard, which is derived from Late Latin  ("a Lombard"), which derived from the Proto-Germanic elements  + ; equivalent to long beard. According to some scholars, the second element derives from Proto-Germanic *bardǭ, *barduz ("axe"), related to German , or the whole word comes from the Proto-Albanian *Lum bardhi "white river" (Compare modern Albanian lum i bardhë).

The name of the region derives from the name of the people of the Lombards who arrived in Italy in 568 and made Pavia their capital. During the Early Middle Ages, "Lombardy" referred to the Kingdom of the Lombards, which was ruled by the Germanic Lombard raiders who had controlled most of early Christian Italy since their invasion of Byzantine Italy in CE 568 until the fall of Pavia on the Ticino river, in CE 774 by the Frankish Charlemagne on Pope's behalf. As such, "Lombardy" and "Italy" were almost interchangeable; by the mid-8th century, the Lombards ruled everywhere except the Papal possessions around Rome—roughly modern Lazio and northern Umbria—Venice and some Byzantine possessions in the south—southern Apulia and Calabria; some coastal settlements including Amalfi, Gaeta, Naples and Sorrento; Sicily and Sardinia; their culture is foundational to Italy in the Middle Ages. The term was also used until around 965 in the form  as the name for the territory roughly covering modern Apulia, which the Byzantines had recovered from the Lombard rump state Duchy of Benevento.

Geography

It is bordered by Canton Ticino and Canton Graubünden of Switzerland to the north, and by the Italian regions of Trentino-Alto Adige/Südtirol and Veneto to the east, Emilia-Romagna to the south and Piedmont to the west. Lombardy has three natural zones; mountains, hills and plains—the last being divided into Alta (high plains) and Bassa (low plains).

Soils

The orography of Lombardy is characterised by three distinct belts; a northern mountainous belt constituted by the Alpine relief, a central piedmont area of mostly alluvial pebbly soils, and the Lombard section of the Padan Plain in the south of the region.

The most important mountainous area is the Alpine zone, which includes the Lepontine and Rhaetian Alps—Piz Bernina, the Bergamo Alps, the Ortler Alps and the Adamello massif. It is followed by the Alpine foothills zone Prealpi, the main peaks of which are the Grigna Group, Resegone , and Presolana.

The plains of Lombardy, which are formed by alluvial deposits, can be divided into the Alta—an upper, permeable ground zone in the north—and the Bassa, a lower zone dotted by the line of fontanili, spring waters rising from impermeable ground. Inconsistent with the three distinctions above is the small sub-region of Oltrepò Pavese, which is formed by the Apennine foothills beyond the Po River.

Hydrography

The numerous lakes of Lombardy are all of glacial origin and are located in the northern highlands. From west to east, these are: Lake Maggiore, Lake Lugano (both shared with Switzerland), Lake Como, Lake Iseo, Lake Idro, and Lake Garda (the largest lake in Italy). South of the Alps are a succession of low hills of morainic origin that were formed during the Last Glacial Period and small, barely fertile plateaux with typical heaths and conifer woods. A minor mountainous area the Oltrepò Pavese lies in the Apennines range south of the Po.

Flora and fauna

The plains have been intensively cultivated for centuries, and little of the original environment remains. The most common trees are elm, alder, sycamore, poplar, willow and hornbeam. In the area of the foothills lakes, however, olive, cypresses and larches grow, as do varieties of subtropical flora such as magnolia, azalea and acacias. Numerous species of endemic flora in the Prealpine area include some species of saxifrage, Lombardy garlic, groundsel and bellflowers.

The highlands are characterised by the typical vegetation of the Italian Alps. Shrubs such as rhododendron, dwarf pine and juniper are native to the summit zone beyond .

Lombardy includes many protected areas. The most important are Stelvio National Park—the largest Italian natural park, with typically alpine wildlife such as red deer, roe deer, ibex, chamois, foxes, ermine and golden eagles; and the Ticino Valley Natural Park, which was instituted in 1974 on the Lombard side of the Ticino River to protect one of the last major examples of fluvial forest in northern Italy. There have also been efforts to protect the endangered Italian agile frog.

Other parks in the region are the Campo dei Fiori and the Cinque Vette Park, both of which are located in the Province of Varese.

Climate

Lombardy has a wide array of climates due to variance in elevation, proximity to inland water basins, and large metropolitan areas. The climate is mainly humid subtropical (Köppen Cfa), especially in the plains, though with significant variations to the Köppen model, especially in the normally long, damp, and cold winters. The plains are often subject to fog during the coldest months.

In the Alpine foothills with oceanic climate (Köppen Cfb), numerous lakes have a mitigating influence, allowing typically Mediterranean crops (olive, citrus fruit) to grow. In the hills and mountains, the climate is humid continental (Köppen Dfb). In the valleys, it is relatively mild while it can be severely cold with copious snowfalls above .

Precipitation is more intense in the Prealpine zone, up to  annually, but is also abundant n the plains and alpine zones, with an average of  annually.

Pollution
Lombardy is one of the most-air-polluted areas of Europe. Because of high levels of industrialisation and the lack of wind due to the region being enclosed between mountain ranges, air pollution remains a severe problem in Lombardy and northern Italy.

In March 2019, the European Space Agency (ESA) published images taken from its satellites that show a large stain composed of nitrogen dioxide and fine particles above the Po Valley area. Lombardy is the geographic and economic centre of this area, with more than 10 million residents and the highest GRP per inhabitant of the country. Most of its major cities are located in the Po River basin, which crosses the region. The stain analysed by ESA is the main reason Po Valley air pollution levels are so high. Milan also has high levels of ozone and nitrogen oxides, which are mainly produced by cars diesel and petrol engines.

According to Chicago Energy Policy Institute, which has recently developed the Air Quality Life Index (AQLI), Po Valley air pollution reduces life expectancy by about six months. Air pollution in the Po Valley is connected to livestock and factories. The use of NPK fertilizers, made of nitrogen, phosphorus and potassium, along with manure emissions from intensive breeding and high levels of nitrogen dioxide released by diesel and petrol engines are all causes of pollution in the north of Italy. Lombardy also produces vast amounts of animal waste, a big contributor to pollution. Lombardy produces more than 40% of Italy's milk and over half of the Italian pig production is located in the Po Valley.

According to research published in The Lancet Planetary Health, in January 2021, Brescia and Bergamo had the highest death rate from fine particulate matter (PM2.5) in Europe.

The data show many cities in Lombardy and the Po Valley suffer the most-serious impact of poor air quality in Europe, primarily the metropolitan area of Milan, which is 13th in terms of fine particulate impact, with an annual premature death rate of 3,967 – approximately 9% of the total.

History

Prehistory and antiquity

It is thought from archaeological findings of ceramics, arrows, axes, and carved stones, the area of current-day Lombardy has been settled at least since the second millennium BC. Well-preserved rock drawings left by ancient Camuni in the Valcamonica depicting animals, people, and symbols were made over 8,000 years before the Iron Age, based on about 300,000 records.

The many artifacts found in a necropolis near Lake Maggiore and the River Ticino demonstrate the presence of the Golasecca Bronze Age culture that prospered in the western Lombardy between the ninth and the fourth centuries BC. In the following centuries, Lombardy was inhabited by different peoples; the Etruscans founded the city of Mantua and spread the use of writing. It was seat of the Celtic Canegrate culture starting from the 13th century BC, and later of the Celtic Golasecca culture. From the fifth century BC, the area was invaded by more Celtic Gallic tribes coming from north of the Alps. These people settled in several cities including Milan and extended their rule to the Adriatic Sea. Celtic development was halted by the Roman expansion in the Po Valley from the third century BC. After centuries of struggle, in 194 BC, the entirety of modern-day Lombardy became a Roman province called Gallia Cisalpina—"Gaul on the inner side (with respect to Rome) of the Alps".

The Roman culture and language overwhelmed the former civilisation in the following years, and Lombardy became one of the most-developed and richest areas of Italy with the construction of roads, and the development of agriculture and trade. Important figures were born here, such as Pliny the Elder (in Como) and Virgil (in Mantua). In late antiquity the strategic role of Lombardy was emphasised by the temporary move of the capital of the Western Empire to Mediolanum (Milan). Here, in 313 AD, Roman Emperor Constantine issued the famous Edict of Milan that gave freedom of confession to all religions within the Roman Empire.

Kingdom of the Lombards

During and after the fall of the Western Empire, Lombardy heavily suffered from destruction brought about by a series of invasions by tribal peoples. After 540, Pavia become the permanent capital of the Ostrogothic Kingdom, the fixed site of the court and the royal treasury. The last and most effective invasion was that of the Germanic Lombards or Longobards, whose nation migrated to the region from the Carpathian basin in fear of the conquering Pannonian Avars in 568. The Lombards' long-lasting reign, with its capital in Pavia, gave the current name to the region. There was a close relationship between the Frankish, Bavarian and Lombard nobility for many centuries.

After the initial struggles, relationships between the Lombard people and the Gallo-Roman peoples improved. The Lombard language and culture was integrated with the Latin culture, leaving evidence in many names, the legal code and laws. The Lombards became intermixed with the Roman population owing to their relatively smaller number. The end of Lombard rule came in 774, when the Frankish king Charlemagne conquered Pavia, deposed Desiderius the last Lombard king, and annexed the Kingdom of Italy—mostly northern and central present-day Italy—to his newly established Holy Roman Empire. Charlemagne was crowned by the Pope on 25 December 800. The former Lombard dukes and nobles were replaced by other German vassals, prince-bishops and marquises. The entire northern part of the Italian peninsula continued to be called "Lombardy" and its population "Lombards" throughout the following centuries.

Communes and the Empire

In the tenth century, Lombardy, although formally under the rule of the Holy Roman Empire, was included in the kingdom of Italy, of which Pavia remained the capital until 1024. Starting gradually in the late-11th century, Lombardy became divided into many small, autonomous city-states, the medieval communes. Also in the 11th century, the region's economy underwent a significant boom due to improved trading, sartorial manufacturing of silk and wool, and agricultural conditions; arms manufacturing for the purpose of defensive army development, by the German imperial divisions of Guelphs (Welfen) defending Pope and Ghibellins (Wibellingen) defending Emperor, became a significant factor. As in other areas of Italy, this led to a growing self-acknowledgement of the cities, whose increasing wealth made them able to defy the traditional feudal supreme power that was represented by the German emperors and their local legates. This process peaked in the 12th and 13th centuries, when Lombard Leagues formed by allied cities of Lombardy, usually led by Milan, defeated the Hohenstaufen Emperor Frederick I, at Legnano but not his grandson Frederick II at Battle of Cortenuova. Subsequently, among the local city-states, a process of consolidation took place, and by the end of the 14th century, two signoria emerged as rival hegemons in Lombardy; Milan and Mantua.

Renaissance duchies of Milan and Mantua

In the 15th century, the Duchy of Milan was a major political, economical and military force in Europe. Milan and Mantua became centres of the Renaissance, whose culture with people such as Leonardo da Vinci and Andrea Mantegna, and works of art such as da Vinci's The Last Supper were highly regarded. The enterprising class of the communes extended its trade and banking activities well into northern Europe; the metanym "Lombard" designated a merchant or banker from northern Italy, for example Lombard Street, London. The name "Lombardy" came to denote the whole of northern Italy until the 15th century and sometimes later. From the 14th century onward, the instability created by the internal and external struggles ended in the creation of noble seigniories, the most-significant of whom were the Viscontis (later Sforzas) in Milan and of the Gonzagas in Mantua. This wealth, however, attracted the now-more-organised armies of national powers such as France and Austria, which waged a lengthy battle for Lombardy in the late-15th to early 16th centuries.

Late-Middle Ages, Renaissance and Enlightenment

After the Battle of Pavia, the Duchy of Milan became a possession of the Habsburgs of Spain; the new rulers did little to improve the economy of Lombardy, instead imposing a growing series of taxes to support their lengthy series of European wars. The eastern part of modern-day Lombardy, including the cities Bergamo and Brescia, was controlled by the Republic of Venice, which had begun to extend its influence in the area from the 14th century onwards. Between the mid-15th century and the battle of Marignano in 1515, the northern part of east Lombardy from Airolo to Chiasso (modern Ticino), and the Valtellina valley came under possession of the Old Swiss Confederacy.

Pestilences like that of 1628–1630, which Alessandro Manzoni described in his I Promessi Sposi, and the general decline of Italy's economy in the 17th and 18th centuries halted further development of Lombardy. In 1706 the Austrian Empire came to power, and introduced some economic and social measures that allowed a degree of recovery to occur.

Austrian rule was interrupted in the late-18th century by the French; under Napoleon, Lombardy became the centre of the Cisalpine Republic and of the Kingdom of Italy, both of which were puppet states of France's First Empire, with Milan as capital and Napoleon as head of state. During this period, Lombardy regained Valtellina from Switzerland.

Modern era

 

The restoration of Austrian rule in 1815 as the Kingdom of Lombardy–Venetia was characterised by a struggle with the new ideals introduced by the Napoleonic era. The popular but short-lived republic established by the 1848 revolution was suppressed, leading to renewed Austrian rule, which ended when Lombardy was annexed to the Kingdom of Italy in 1859 as a result of the Second Italian War of Independence except Province of Mantua remained in Austrian hands as part of Veneto till 1866. After the annexation, Lombardy achieved its present-day territorial shape by adding the Oltrepò Pavese, formerly the southern part of the Province of Novara, to the Province of Pavia.

COVID-19 pandemic

In early 2020, Lombardy was severely affected by the COVID-19 pandemic, in which Italy was one of the worst-affected countries in Europe. Several towns were quarantined from 22 February after community transmission was documented in Lombardy and Veneto the previous day. The entirety of Lombardy was placed under lockdown on 8 March, followed by all of Italy the following day, making Italy the first country to implement a nationwide lockdown in response to the epidemic, which the World Health Organization (WHO) declared a pandemic on 11 March. The lockdown was extended twice, and the region toughened restrictions on 22 March, banning outdoor exercise and the use of vending machines, but from the beginning of May, following a reported decrease in the number of active cases, restrictions were gradually relaxed.

Economy
, the gross regional product (GRP) of Lombardy was equal to over €366 billion and accounted for about 22% of Italy's total GDP. Lombardy's 2021 GRP was €36,500 per person, more than 25% higher than the national average of €25,729.

Lombardy's services sector has grown since the 1980s, led by innovative activities in business services, credit and financial services. Lombardy also remains the main industrial area of Italy.

Lombardy has cultural and economic relationships with many foreign countries including Azerbaijan, Austria, France, Hungary, Switzerland (especially the cantons of Ticino and Graubünden), Canada (the Province of Quebec), Germany (the States of Bavaria, Saxony, and Saxony-Anhalt), Kuwait, the Netherlands (Province of Zuid-Holland), and Russia.

Lombardy is a member of the Four Motors for Europe, an international economical organization whose other members are Baden-Württemberg in Germany, Catalonia in Spain, and Auvergne-Rhône-Alpes in France. The Lombardy region is also part of the EUSALP, which promotes innovation, sustainability, and economy in the Alpine regions of Austria, France, Liechtenstein, Northern Italy, Southern Germany, Switzerland, and Slovenia, and ARGE ALP, an economic forum of alpine regions of Austria, Northern Italy, Southern Germany, and Switzerland. Economical and cultural relationship are also strong with neighbouring Italian regions Friuli-Venezia Giulia, South Tyrol, Trentino, and Veneto.

The European Union has developed the Central Europe program in 2014–2020 to foster cooperation between Lombardy and other northern Italian regions and several countries in central Europe.

The region can be broadly divided into three economic areas: Milan, where the services sector comprises 65.3% of employment; the provinces of Varese, Como, Lecco, Monza and Brianza, Bergamo and Brescia, where there is a highly industrialised economy and a rich agricultural sector; and the provinces of Sondrio, Pavia, Cremona, Mantova and Lodi, where there is consistent agricultural activity and an above-average development of the services sector.

Agriculture 

The productivity of agriculture is enhanced by a use of fertilisers and the traditional abundance of water, which has been boosted since the Middle Ages by the construction of irrigation systems that were partly designed by Leonardo da Vinci. Lower plains are used for fodder crops, cereals (rice, wheat and maize) and sugar beet. Lombardy is one of the main European regions for rice production and together with Piedmont, produces 93% of Italian rice. Cultivation is concentrated in the provinces of Pavia (Milan, Lodi  and Mantua. Produce of the higher plains includes cereals, vegetables, fruit trees and mulberries. Fruits and wine are produced in upland areas such as the Prealps and Alps sectors in the north.

Lombardy is a centre of animal breading, which includes dairy cows (36%) and pigs (50%). The region's dairy industry produces 30% of Italian milk, which is used to produce different types of cheese, totalling about 4,715,130 tonnes, 36% of Italian cheese production.

There are a lot of variety of sausages produces in Lombardy, like Salame Milano, Salame bergamasco, Salame mantovano, Salame di Varzi, Bastardei, Salam casalin, Salame Brianza, Salame pancettato.

Vineyards cover . The most important produce is the sparkling wines Franciacorta and Oltrepò Pavese, which are produced using the same traditional method as Champagne, unlike other Italian sparkling wines, which use the charmat method. Lombardy ranks 9 of 20 in production of DOC and DOCG wines with 877.351 hl. Lombardy also produces still red, white and rosé wines made from a variety of grapes, including Nebbiolo wines in the Valtellina region and Trebbiano di Lugana white wines produced with the Chiaretto-style rosé along the shores of Lake Garda.

Brescia is also the main production centre of Italian caviar.

The main activity in Canneto sull'Oglio is the nursery production of broad-leaved plants, for which much land is dedicated.

Aerospace and defence 

Italy is a major exporter of heavy helicopters (over ) with market share of about 30%. The headquarters of Leonardo Helicopters Division (ex-AgustaWestland) is in Lombardy, and is responsible for about 33.3% of the company's orders. The region also has a plant of Leonardo Aircraft Division (ex-Aermacchi). The main helicopter design, production and training facilities are located in Cascina Costa di Samarate, Vergiate and Sesto Calende. The company's aircraft division manufactures military training aircraft in Venegono Superiore.

The world oldest firearms manufacturer Beretta is located in Gardone Val Trompia. Other firearms manufacturers in the region are Tanfoglio and Pedersoli. Ammunition is produced by Fiocchi. The former OTO Melara, now part of Leonardo Electronics Division in Brescia, produces small-calibre naval and airborne weapons.

Automotive 
There is no longer any car production in Lombardy; the factories of mass-market manufacturers Alfa Romeo, Autobianchi and Innocenti having been closed, abandoned or demolished. Iveco continues to manufacture light trucks Daily in Suzzara and makes lorries EuroCargo in Brescia. Same-Deutz Fahr manufactures tractors under the brands SAME and Lamborghini in Treviglio, and BCS Group makes tractors in Abbiategrasso.

The best-known automotive-parts suppliers are Brembo, Bergamo (ceramic brake systems); Pirelli, Milan (tyres); and Magneti Marelli, Corbetta (electronic systems, powertrain).

Motorcycles from Lombardy:

Electronics 

The largest European semiconductor company STMicroelectronics employs 5,600 people at its plant in a suburb of Milan. Manufacturers of general-purpose integrated circuits (ICs) Agrate Brianza, which employs 4,500, and Cornaredo, which employs 1,100, have R&D and production facilities.

SAES Getters in Lainate produce getters, alkaline metal dispensers, cathodes and materials for thermal management. Their products are used in various devices such as X-ray tubes, microwave tubes, solid state lasers, electron sources, photomultipliers, radio-frequency amplification systems, night-vision devices, pressure sensors, gyroscopes for navigation systems and MEMS devices.

Magneti Marelli has headquarters and manufactures automotive electronics in Corbetta. Leonardo Electronics Division in Nerviano designs and develops airborne radar and computers, space equipment. Candy Hoover and Whirlpool (brands: Whirlpool, Indesit, Ariston, Hot Point, Ignis) make home appliances in Lombardy.

Fashion 

Lombardy has always been an important centre for silk and textile production, notably the cities Pavia, Vigevano and Cremona. Milan is one of the fashion capitals of the world; the city has approximately 12,000 companies, 800 showrooms and 6,000 sales outlets; the city hosts the headquarters of global fashion houses. The best-known high-class shopping district is Quadrilatero della moda.

In 2009, Milan was regarded as the world fashion capital, surpassing New York, Paris and London. Most of the major Italian fashion brands, such as Luxottica, Valentino, Versace, Prada, Armani and Dolce & Gabbana and Zegna are currently headquartered in Milan.

Castel Goffredo, in the Province of Mantua, is known locally as the "city of the stocking"; it is an important district for the production of women's hosiery. Fourteen other communities also belonging to this district are:

Acquafredda
Asola
Casalmoro
Casaloldo
Casalromano
Castiglione delle Stiviere
Ceresara
Isola Dovarese
Mariana Mantovana
Medole
Piubega
Remedello
Solferino and
Visano.

Buttons are manufactured in the industrial district of Grumello del Monte (Mabo Group) and lingeries made in the industrial district of Val Camonica.

Furniture 
Furniture is manufactured in the industrial district around Brianza, which has an annual turnover of about €2 billion from 1,700 companies. The furniture factories, which have about 40,000 employees, are mainly concentrated in Lissone, Meda, Cantù and Mariano Comense. Other important production centres are Giussano, Seveso, and Seregno. This district has close relations with Milan's design industry. A number of large furniture exhibitions take place in Milan, including "Salone del Mobile Milano".

Unemployment 
The unemployment rate of Lombardy stood at 5% in 2020. In that year, regional unemployment was one of the lowest in Italy.

Demographics

One-sixth of the Italian population, about 10 million people, live in Lombardy (16.2% of the national population; 2% of the European Union population).

The population is highly concentrated in the Milan metropolitan area (2,029 inh./km2) and the Alpine foothills that compose the southern section of the provinces Varese, Como, Lecco, Monza and Brianza and Bergamo, (1,200 inh./km2). A lower average population density (250 inh./km2) is found in the Po Valley and the lower Brescia valleys; much lower densities (fewer than 60 inh./km2) inhabit the northern mountain areas and the southern Oltrepò Pavese subregion.

The growth of the regional population was particularly sustained during the 1950s–1960s, due to a prolonged economic boom, high birth rates and strong migration inflows—especially from southern Italy. Since the 1980s, Lombardy has become the destination of a large number of international migrants; in the early 21st century, more than a quarter of all foreign-born residents in Italy live in this region. , the Italian National Institute of Statistics (ISTAT) estimated 1,139,430 foreign-born people live in Lombardy, equal to 11.4% of the total population. The primary religion is Roman Catholicism; significant religious minorities include Christian Waldenses, Protestants and Orthodox Christians, as well as Jews, Sikhs and Muslims.

Government and politics

Lombardy has a system of representative democracy in which the President of the Region is the head of government and of a pluriform multi-party system. Executive power is vested in the regional government and legislative power is vested in the Regional Council.

From 1945 to the early 1990s, the moderate Christian Democrats maintained a large majority of the popular support and the control of the most important cities and provinces from the end of the Second World War. The opposition Italian Communist Party was a considerable presence only in southern Lombardy and in the working-class districts of Milan; their base, however, was increasingly eroded by the rival centrist Italian Socialist Party until the Mani Pulite corruption scandal, which spread from Milan to the whole of Italy, almost completely erased the old political class.

This, together with general disaffection for the central government, led to the sudden growth of the secessionist Northern League, which was particularly strong in the mountain and rural areas. Since 2002, Lombardy remained strongly conservative, overwhelmingly voting for Silvio Berlusconi in six general elections. The regional capital Milan elected progressive Giuliano Pisapia at the 2011 municipal elections and the 2013 regional elections saw a narrow victory for the centre-right coalition.

On 22 October 2017 a non-binding autonomy referendum took place in Lombardy. The turnout was 38.3%, of which 95.3% voted in favour. In 2018, the Lombardy regional government was still under negotiation with Rome for the devolution of some powers.

Administrative divisions
The region of Lombardy is divided in 11 administrative provinces, 1 metropolitan city and 1,530 communes.

Culture
Lombardy has a rich, diverse cultural heritage ranging from prehistory to the present day. Artifacts from the Roman period and the Renaissance can be found in museums and churches. Major tourist destinations in the region include (in order of arrivals ): 

Milan (4,527,889 arrivals)
Bergamo (242,942), 
Brescia (229,710)
Como (215,320)
Varese (107,442),
Mantua (88,902)
Monza (75,839)
Pavia (56,604)
Lake Garda (429,376) 
Como (322,585)
Lake Iseo (123,337) and Maggiore (71,055).

UNESCO World Heritage Sites

There are nine UNESCO World Heritage sites wholly or partially located in Lombardy. Some of these comprise several individual objects in different locations. One of the entries has been listed as natural heritage and the others are cultural heritage sites.

At Monte San Giorgio on the border with Swiss canton Ticino just south of Lake Lugano, a wide range of marine Triassic fossils have been found. During the Triassic period, 240 million years ago, the area was a shallow tropical lagoon. Fossils include reptiles, fish, crustaceans and insects.

The Rock Drawings in Valcamonica date to between 8000BC and 1000BC, covering prehistoric periods from the Epipaleolithic and Mesolithic to the Iron Age. The engravings depict agricultural and war scenes, alongside more abstract symbols.

The multi-centred heritage site Prehistoric pile dwellings around the Alps includes 111 objects in France, Switzerland, Italy, Germany, Austria and Slovenia, of which 10 are located in Lombardy. Each of these objects consists of remnants of buildings erected on wooden piles in sub-alpine rivers, lakes and wetlands, which were built between 5000BC and 500BC. In general, only the submerged wooden parts have been preserved in the alluvial sediment, although in some places pile buildings have been reconstructed.

Another multi-centred site, Longobards in Italy, Places of Power (568–774 A.D.) consists of seven locations across mainland Italy which illustrate the history of the Lombard period. Two of the sites are in modern-day Lombardy: the fortifications (the castrum and the Torba Tower), and the church of Santa Maria foris portas ("outside the gates") has Byzantinesque frescoes at Castelseprio, and the monastic complex of San Salvatore-Santa Giulia at Brescia. The UNESCO site at Brescia also includes the remains of its Roman forum, the best-preserved in northern Italy.

The Church and Dominican Convent of Santa Maria delle Grazie in Milan with "The Last Supper" by Leonardo da Vinci represent architectural and painting styles of the 15th-century Renaissance period. The towns Mantua and Sabbioneta are also listed as a combined World Heritage site relating to this period, here focussing more on town-planning aspects of the time than on architectural detail. While Mantua was rebuilt in the 15th and 16th centuries, according to Renaissance principles, Sabbioneta was planned as a new town in the 16th century.

The Sacri Monti of Piedmont and Lombardy are a group of nine sites in north-west Italy, two of which are in Lombardy. The concept of holy mountains can be found elsewhere in Europe. These sites were created as centres of pilgrimage by placing chapels in the natural landscape, and were loosely modelled on the topography of Jerusalem. In Lombardy, Sacro Monte del Rosario di Varese and Sacro Monte della Beata Vergine del Soccorso, which were built in the early-to mid-17th century, mark the architectural transition from the late Renaissance to the Baroque style.

Crespi d'Adda is a company town that was founded in 1878 to accommodate workers of a local textile mill. At its height, the town was home to 3,200 employees and their families.

Parco Naturalistico-Archeologico della Rocca di Manerba del Garda is a fortress of Manerba del Garda.

The Rhaetian Railway in the Albula/Bernina Landscapes is mostly located in the Swiss canton Graubünden, but extends over the border into Tirano. The site is listed because of the complex railway engineering (tunnels, viaducts and avalanche galleries) necessary to take the narrow-gauge railway across the main chain of the Alps. The two railway lines were opened in several stages between 1904 and 1910.

The Venetian Works of Defence between the 16th and 17th centuries: Stato da Terra – western Stato da Mar is a transnational system of fortifications that were built by the Republic of Venice on its mainland domains (Stato da Terra) and its territories stretching along the Adriatic coast (Stato da Mar). This site includes the fortified city Bergamo.

Museums

Lombardy has more than 300 museums in subjects such as ethnographic, historical, technical-scientific, artistic and naturalistic fields. Among the region's most-famous museums are:

National Museum of Science and Technology "Leonardo da Vinci" (Milan)
Accademia Carrara (Bergamo)
Mille Miglia (Brescia)
 Santa Giulia Museum (Brescia)
Volta Temple (Como)
Villa Olmo (Como)
Stradivari Museum (Cremona)
Palazzo Te (Mantua)
Pavia Civic Museums
University History Museum, University of Pavia
Natural History Museum (Pavia)
Museum Sacred Art of the Nativity (Gandino)
Basilica of Santa Maria Assunta (Gandino)
 Royal Villa of Monza (Monza).

Other sights

 Cathedral of Milan
 Castello Sforzesco, Milan
 Basilica di Sant'Ambrogio, Milan
 Teatro alla Scala, Milan
 Basilica of San Lorenzo, Milan
 Basilica of Sant'Eustorgio, Milan
 Brera Gallery, Milan
 Bellagio
 Accademia Carrara, Bergamo
 Santa Maria Maggiore and Cappella Colleoni, Bergamo
 The fortified Venetian walls, Bergamo
 Roman and Longobard monuments in Brescia
 Duomo Nuovo, Brescia
 Castelseprio archaeological site
 Certosa di Pavia
 Cathedral of Pavia
 Visconti Castle, Pavia
 San Michele Maggiore, Pavia
 San Pietro in Ciel d'Oro, Pavia
 Santa Maria del Carmine, Pavia
 Como Cathedral and Basilica of Sant'Abbondio, Como
 Duomo and Torrazzo, Cremona
 Lake Como
 Lake Garda
 Lake Iseo
 Tempio Civico della Beata Vergine Incoronata, Lodi
 Royal Villa of Monza
 Villa Toeplitz, Varese

Cuisine

Rice is often used in soups and risotti, such as "risotto alla milanese", with saffron. In Monza, a popular recipe adds pieces of sausages to the risotto, while in Pavia they eat Carthusian risotto, according to the legend created by the monks of the Certosa, which is based on crayfish, carrots and onions. They also eat risotto with eye beans, and a version with sausage and bonarda, and risotto with common hops (ürtis in pavese dialect). Polenta is common throughout the region. 

Regional cheeses include Robiola, Crescenza, Taleggio, Gorgonzola and Grana Padano. Butter and cream are used. Single pot dishes, which take little work to prepare, are popular. Common types of pasta include Casoncelli in Brescia and Bergamo and Pizzoccheri in Valtellina. In Mantua, festivals feature tortelli di zucca (ravioli with pumpkin filling) accompanied by melted butter and followed by turkey stuffed with chicken or other stewed meats. Among typical regional desserts is Nocciolini di Canzo—dry biscuits.

Typical dishes and products

 Casoncelli
 Carpaccio di Bresaola
 Pizzoccheri (tagliatelle of buckwheat and wheat, laced with butter, green vegetables, potatoes, sage and garlic, topped with Casera cheese)
 Risotto alla milanese
 Zuppa pavese
 Tortelli di zucca (pumpkin-filled pasta)
 Polenta (eaten also in its taragna variant in the Northern part of the region)
 Ossobuco
 Cotoletta (cutlet) alla milanese
 Cassoeula
 Lo Spiedo Bresciano – spit roast of different cuts of meat with butter and sage
 Salamella (Italian Sausage without fennel or anise, always served grilled) 
 Salame d'oca di Mortara (goose salami)
 Gorgonzola cheese
 Taleggio cheese
 Stracchino cheese
 Bitto cheese
 Rosa Camuna cheese
 Grana Padano cheese
 Mascarpone
 Panettone
 Sbrisolona cake
 Amaretti di Saronno
 Torrone
 Mostarda

Wines

 Franciacorta
 Nebbiolo red
 Bellavista
 Santi
 Nino Negri
 Bonarda Lombardy
 Inferno (Valtellina)
 Grumello (Valtellina)
 Sassella (Valtellina)

Music

Each of Lombardy's 12 provinces has its own musical traditions. Bergamo is famous for being the birthplace of Gaetano Donizetti and home of the Teatro Donizetti; Brescia hosts the impressive 1709 Teatro Grande; Cremona is regarded as the origin of the violin and is home to several of the most prestigious luthiers; and Mantua was one of the founding and most important cities in 16th- and 17th-century opera and classical music.

Other cities such as Lecco, Lodi, Varese and Pavia (Teatro Fraschini) also have rich musical traditions, but Milan is the centre of the Lombard musical scene. It was the workplace of Giuseppe Verdi, one of the most famous and influential 19th-century opera composers. The province has acclaimed theatres, such as the Piccolo Teatro and the Teatro Arcimboldi; however, the most famous is the 1778 Teatro alla Scala (popularly La Scala), one of the most important and prestigious opera houses in the world.

Language

Lombard is widely used in Lombardy, in diglossia with Italian. Lombard is a language belonging to the Gallo-Italic group within the Romance languages. It is a cluster of homogeneous varieties used by at least 3,500,000 native speakers in Lombardy and some areas of neighbouring regions, such as the eastern part of Piedmont and the southern Switzerland cantons of Ticino and Graubünden.

The Lombard language should not be confused with that of the Lombards – Lombardic language, a Germanic language extinct since the Middle Ages.

Sports

The most popular sport in Lombardy is football. Lombardy has some of the most-successful men's football teams in the country. In the 2022-2023 Serie A season, Lombardy hosts 4 out of 20 teams: A.C. Milan and Inter Milan (both based in Milan) and Atalanta B.C. (based in Bergamo); A.C. Monza (based in Monza). Other big teams of the region are Brescia Calcio, and U.S. Cremonese playing in the 2020-21 Serie B, and Calcio Lecco 1912, U.C. AlbinoLeffe, Como 1907, Aurora Pro Patria 1919, A.C. Renate, A.S. Giana Erminio, S.S.D. Pro Sesto and U.S. Pergolettese 1932 playing in the 2020-21 Serie C.

Olimpia Milano (based in Milan) is the most-successful men's basketball team in Italy. In the 2020–21 LBA season 5 teams out of 15 are from Lombardy (Olimpia Milano, Pallacanestro Brescia, Pallacanestro Varese, Pallacanestro Cantù, Guerino Vanoli Basket).

Milan will host the 2026 Winter Olympics alongside Cortina d'Ampezzo. The Autodromo Nazionale di Monza, located outside Milan, hosts the Formula One Italian Grand Prix. The Giro d'Italia, a famous annual bicycle race, usually ends in Milan. Alpine skiing is also important for the region; the FIS Alpine Ski World Cup holds an annual race in Bormio.

Twinning and covenants 
  Nuevo León

See also 

 2017 Lombard autonomy referendum
 COVID-19 pandemic in Italy
 List of European regions by GDP

Notes

References

Further reading
 Cochrane, Eric. Historians and historiography in the Italian Renaissance (U of Chicago Press, 1981).
 Conca Messina, Silvia A., and Catia Brilli. "Agriculture and nobility in Lombardy. Land, management and innovation (1815-1861)." Business History (2019): 1-25.
 de Klerck, Bram. The Brothers Campi: Images and Devotion. Religious Painting in Sixteenth-Century Lombardy (Amsterdam UP. 1999).
 Di Tullio, Matteo. "Cooperating in time of crisis: war, commons, and inequality in Renaissance Lombardy." Economic History Review 71.1 (2018): 82–105.
 Di Tullio, Matteo. The wealth of communities: war, resources and cooperation in Renaissance Lombardy (Ashgate, 2014).
 Gamberini, Andrea. The Clash of Legitimacies: The State-Building Process in Late Medieval Lombardy (2018) online
 Greenfield, Kent Roberts. Economics and liberalism in the Risorgimento: a study of nationalism in Lombardy, 1814-1848 (1934).
 Klang, Daniel M. "Cesare Beccaria and the clash between jurisprudence and political economy in eighteenth-century Lombardy." Canadian journal of history 23.3 (1988): 305–336.
 Klang, Daniel M. "The problem of lease farming in eighteenth-century Piedmont and Lombardy." Agricultural history 76.3 (2002): 578-603 online.
 Klang, Daniel M. Tax reform in eighteenth century Lombardy (1977) online
 Messina, Silvia A. Conca. Cotton Enterprises: Networks and Strategies: Lombardy in the Industrial Revolution, 1815-1860 (2018) excerpt
 Pyle, Cynthia Munro. Milan and Lombardy in the Renaissance: Essays in cultural history (1997).
 Sella, Domenico. Crisis and continuity : the economy of Spanish Lombardy in the seventeenth century (1979) online
 Soresina, Marco. "Images of Lombardy in historiography." Modern Italy 16.1 (2011): 67–85.
 Storrs, Christopher. "The Army of Lombardy and the Resilience of Spanish Power in Italy in the Reign of Carlos II (1665-1700) (Part I)." War in History 4.4 (1997): 371–397.

Guide books
 Daverio, Philippe. Lombardy: 127 Destinations For Discovering Art, History, and Beauty (2016) guide book. excerpt
 Macadam, Alta, and Annabel Barber. Blue Guide Lombardy, Milan & the Italian Lakes (2020) excerpt
 Williams Jr., Egerton R. Lombard Towns in Italy; Or, The Cities of Ancient Lombardy (1914) online

External links

 Official tourism website of Lombardy

 
NUTS 2 statistical regions of the European Union
Regions of Italy
Wine regions of Italy